Anthony Lenín Valencia Bajaña (born 21 July 2003) is an Ecuadorian footballer who currently plays as a midfielder for Royal Antwerp.

Club career
Valencia represented the Independiente del Valle youth side at the U-20 Copa Libertadores, with his performances earning him a place in The Guardian's "Next Generation 2020", highlighting the best young players in world football.

On 8 June 2022 it was announced that Valencia would join Belgian club Royal Antwerp on a 4 year deal.

Career statistics

Club

References

2003 births
Living people
Sportspeople from Guayaquil
Ecuadorian footballers
Association football midfielders
Ecuadorian Serie B players
Ecuadorian Serie A players
Belgian Pro League players
Deportivo Azogues footballers
C.S.D. Independiente del Valle footballers
Royal Antwerp F.C. players
Ecuadorian expatriate footballers
Expatriate footballers in Belgium